Kokino is an archaeological site (megalithic observatory) in North Macedonia, in Staro Nagoričane Municipality.

Kokino may also refer to:
 , village in North Macedonia, in Staro Nagoričane Municipality
 Kokino (rural locality), several rural localities in Russia